In 2014, the Australian radio station ABC Classic FM held the Classic 100 Baroque and Before countdown.

The selection of works available in the survey was determined between 11 April and 22 April (with the public being able to add works to the list initiated by the station). Voting by the public for the finalised list of works was held between 2 May and 19 May. The countdown was broadcast from 6 to 9 June 2014.

Countdown results
The results of the countdown are as follows:

By composer
The following 31 composers, including five anonymous, were featured in the countdown:

See also
Classic 100 Countdowns

References

External links

Classic 100 Countdowns (ABC)
2014 in Australian music